Octamethylene-bis(5-dimethylcarbamoxyisoquinolinium bromide) is an extremely potent carbamate nerve agent. It works by inhibiting the acetylcholinesterase, causing acetylcholine to accumulate. Since the agent molecule is positively charged, it does not cross the blood brain barrier very well.

Toxicity
Octamethylene-bis(5-dimethylcarbamoxyisoquinolinium bromide) is an extremely toxic nerve agent that can be lethal even at extremely low doses. The LD50 in mice and rabbits is 16 μg/kg and 6 μg/kg, respectively.

Synthesis
5-Hydroxyisoquinoline and dimethylcarbamoyl chloride is heated on a steam bath for 2 hours. The mixture is then cooled and treated with benzene. The resulting solid is then dissolved in water. Sodium hydroxide is added to make the solution basic. The solution is extracted with chloroform and then dried with magnesium sulfate. The solvent is evaporated and the solid residue is then recrystallized from petroleum ether. The resulting product, 5-dimethylcarbamoxyisoquinoline, is then mixed with 1,8-dibromooctane in acetonitrile and refluxed for 8 hours. After cooling, the precipitate is filtered and recrystallized from acetonitrile. The product is then dried in vacuo for 14 hours at room temperature, resulting in the final product.

See also
EA-3887
EA-3966
EA-3990
EA-4056
T-1123
VX (nerve agent)

References

Carbamate nerve agents
Isoquinolines
Quaternary ammonium compounds
Acetylcholinesterase inhibitors
Bromides
Biscarbamates
Bisquaternary anticholinesterases
Aromatic carbamates